John J. Thomson is a production sound mixer. He was  nominated in the 28th Genie Awards for a Genie Award for Best Achievement in Overall Sound (with Steph Carrier and Martin Lee).

Recognition 
 2008 Genie Award for Best Achievement in Overall Sound (with Steph Carrier and Martin Lee) - Nominee
 2006 Gemini Award for Best Sound in a Comedy, Variety, or Performing Arts Program or Series - Black Widow (shared with Steve Hammond, Ronayne Higginson, Kirk Lynds, David McCallum, David Rose, Lou Solakofski)
 2005 Gemini Award for Best Sound in a Dramatic Program - Lives of the Saints - Won
 2003 Cinema Audio Society CAS Award for Outstanding Sound Mixing for Television - MOW's and Mini-Series - Martin and Lewis - Nominated (shared with Terry O'Bright (re-recording mixer), Nello Torri (re-recording mixer), Peter Kelsey (re-recording mixer))
 2001 Cinema Audio Society CAS Award for Outstanding Sound Mixing for Television - MOW's and Mini-Series - Dirty Pictures - Nominated (shared with Todd Orr (re-recording mixer), Kevin Patrick Burns (re-recording mixer), Tom Perry (re-recording mixer))
 2000 Emmy Award for Outstanding Sound Mixing for a Miniseries or a Movie - Dirty Pictures - Nominated (shared with Kevin Patrick Burns (re-recording mixer),Todd Orr (re-recording mixer),Tom Perry (re-recording mixer))
 1999 Genie Award for Best Overall Sound - Last Night (shared with Dean Giammarco, Miguel Nunes, Paul A. Sharpe)
 1999 Gemini Award for Best Overall Sound in a Dramatic Program or Series - Total Recall 2070 episode "Machine Dreams" Part 1 - Won (Shared with Allen Ormerod, Steve Baine, Scott Shepherd)
 Fall 1998 Gemini Award for  Best Sound in an Information/Documentary Program or Series - Yo-Yo Ma Inspired by Bach episode The Music Garden (shared with David McCallum, Lou Solakofski, Robert Fletcher)

External links 
 

Canadian Screen Award winners
Year of birth missing (living people)
Living people